Preiļi District was an administrative division of Latvia, located in Latgale region, in the country's east. It bordered the former districts of Jēkabpils, Madona, Rēzekne, Krāslava and Daugavpils.

Districts were eliminated during the administrative-territorial reform in 2009.

References

Districts of Latvia